Arz von Wasegg (also Arz von Arzio-Wasegg, Arz von und zu Vasegg, and Arz-Vasegg) is the name of an old South Tyrolean noble family. They were noted as having estates there since at least 1472. The family eventually became hereditary chamberlains of the Prince-Bishopric of Trient and were raised to the counthood in August 1648. In the 19th century, branches lived in Austria and Prussia.

References 

German noble families
European noble families
Austrian noble families
Prussian nobility